Unisławice may refer to the following places in Poland:

Unisławice, Lower Silesian Voivodeship (south-west Poland)
Unisławice, Kuyavian-Pomeranian Voivodeship (north-central Poland)